The 1976 South African Open, also known by its sponsored name South African Breweries Open, was a combined men's and women's tennis tournament played on outdoor hard courts in Johannesburg, South Africa that was part of the 1976 Commercial Union Assurance Grand Prix. It was the 73rd edition of the tournament and was held from 23 November through 30 November 1976. Harold Solomon and Brigitte Cuypers won the singles titles.

Finals

Men's singles
 Harold Solomon defeated  Brian Gottfried 6–2, 6–7, 6–3, 6–4

Women's singles
 Brigitte Cuypers defeated  Laura duPont 6–7, 6–4, 6–1

Men's doubles
 Brian Gottfried /  Sherwood Stewart defeated  Juan Gisbert /  Stan Smith 1–6, 6–1, 6–2, 7–6

Mixed doubles
 Betsy Nagelsen /  Bob Hewitt defeated  Annette DuPlooy /  Deon Joubert 6–2, 7–6

References

External links
 ITF – Johannesburg tournament details

South African Open
South African Open (tennis)
Open
South African Open (tennis)
Sports competitions in Johannesburg
South African Open (tennis), 1976
South African Open (tennis)